Kenley railway station serves Kenley in the London Borough of Croydon in south London. The station is served by trains from Caterham to Purley, East Croydon, London Bridge and London Victoria. It is the last station on this line located within the Greater London area, however Oyster fares are available up to and including the end of the line at Caterham.

On the London-bound platform (Platform 1) is a staffed ticket office (during some peak hours) and a self-service passenger-operated Ticket Machine. A second self-service Ticket Machine is available just outside the Caterham-bound platform (Platform 2) which is suitably located to purchase tickets for the car park which is also located on this side.

Station history

Kenley station was originally opened to passengers along with the line on 5 August 1856 as Coulsdon by the Caterham Railway. In November the same year, the station was renamed Kenley.

On Platform 2 stands a gabled Grade II listed building station house in the "Old English style of Domestic Architecture" (architect: Richard Whittall) and is similar to the original building at Caterham. This was the original station building which housed a small waiting room for passengers and the original ticket office. In 1899 when the Caterham line was made double-track, a new brick Ticket Office was built on the opposite Platform at road level. The original station house was disused and boarded up for a long time, but protected by its listed status. The house was then sold to a private owner in 2007 following refurbishment.

Services
All services at Kenley are operated by Southern using  EMUs.

The typical off-peak service in trains per hour is:
 2 tph to 

Up until September 2022 there were additional off-peak services to London Bridge via Norbury and Tulse Hill.

Connections
London Buses routes 407 and 434 serve the station.

References

External links 
Kenley station house at English Heritage

Grade II listed buildings in the London Borough of Croydon
Railway stations in the London Borough of Croydon
Former South Eastern Railway (UK) stations
Railway stations in Great Britain opened in 1856
Railway stations served by Govia Thameslink Railway
Grade II listed railway stations